Espacio y Desarrollo is an annual Peruvian peer-reviewed scientific journal of geography. It was established in 1989 and is published by the Centro de Investigación en Geografía Aplicada (Pontificia Universidad Católica del Perú). The current editor-in-chief is Ana Sabogal. Espacio y Desarrollo focuses on environmental geography, linking physical geography and human geography. Contributions often highlight the human-environmental relationship. The regional focus is on Latin America.

Abstracting and indexing 
The journal is abstracted and indexed in ERIH PLUS, EBSCOhost and Latindex.

See also 
 Geography portal

References

External links 
 
 Centro de Investigación en Geografía Aplicada

1989 establishments in Peru
Geography journals
Annual journals
Multilingual journals
Spanish-language journals
Publications established in 1989
Pontifical Catholic University of Peru